Miss France 2011, the 64th Miss France pageant was held on 4 December 2010 at Zénith de Caen in Caen. Laury Thilleman of Brittany was crowned the winner.

External links
Official Website

Miss France
2010 in France
2010 beauty pageants
Caen
December 2010 events in France